For the 1988 Vuelta a España, the field consisted of 180 riders; 116 finished the race.

By rider

By nationality

References

Further reading

 Cyclists
1988